The Anglican Diocese of Armidale is a diocese of the Anglican Church of Australia located in the state of New South Wales. As the Diocese of Grafton and Armidale, it was created (from the Diocese of Newcastle) by letters patent in 1863. When the Anglican Diocese of Grafton was split off in 1914, the remaining portion was renamed Armidale, retaining its legal continuity and its incumbent bishop.

Once relatively Anglo-Catholic in its liturgical and theological leanings, since the mid-20th century the diocese has leant more towards the Diocese of Sydney and its particular form of Evangelical teaching and liturgy. The diocese is theologically conservative and holds to the traditional Anglican beliefs on human sexuality, disapproving same-sex unions.

The diocese includes the regional cities of Tamworth and Armidale and the towns of Glen Innes, Tenterfield, Inverell, Moree, Gunnedah and Narrabri.

On 12 December 2020, the synod of the diocese elected Rod Chiswell, vicar of South Tamworth, as the 8th Bishop of Armidale. Chiswell was installed on 27 February 2021.

Cathedral
The cathedral church of the diocese is St Peter's Cathedral in Armidale. It was consecrated for worship in 1875. The cathedral was designed by the Canadian architect John Horbury Hunt who also designed the University of New England. The foundation stone was laid by James F. Turner, Bishop of Grafton and Armidale.

Schools
The Diocese of Armidale has three affiliated independent Anglican schools:
The Armidale School (TAS), founded 1894 
New England Girls' School (NEGS), Armidale, founded 1895
Calrossy Anglican School, Tamworth, incorporating Calrossy Anglican School for Girls (founded 1919), William Cowper Anglican Boys High School and William Cowper Primary School

Linked diocese
Following a 2004 synod visit by Edward Muhima, Bishop of North Kigezi in Uganda, there has been a forging of a support link between the two dioceses. The Diocese of North Kigezi is in the South West of Uganda, with its office in Rukunjiri.

List of bishops

See also

Anglican Pacifist Fellowship
Church Missionary Society
Anglicare
Evangelical Anglicanism
Low church
Calvinism
Fellowship of Confessing Anglicans
GAFCON

References

External links
Diocese of Armidale

 
Armidale
Anglican bishops of Armidale
New England (New South Wales)
Armidale
Evangelical Anglicanism
Evangelicalism in Australia
Anglican Church of Australia Ecclesiastical Province of New South Wales
Anglican bishops of Grafton and Armidale
Lists of Anglican bishops and archbishops
Grafton, New South Wales
Lists of Australian people by occupation
New South Wales-related lists
1863 establishments in Australia